2014 TBL Playoffs was the final phase of the 2013–14 Turkish Basketball League. It started on 12 May 2014. Galatasaray Liv Hospital were the defending champions. When the final series was tied 3-3, Galatasaray Liv Hospital announced they would not appear in game seven due to a referee assignment they weren't satisfied with.  Therefore, Fenerbahçe Ülker won their 6th title.

Bracket

Quarterfinals

Banvit vs. Tofaş

Fenerbahçe Ülker vs. Uşak Sportif

Anadolu Efes vs. Pınar Karşıyaka

Galatasaray Liv Hospital vs. Beşiktaş İntegral Forex

Semifinals

Banvit vs. Galatasaray Liv Hospital

Fenerbahçe Ülker vs. Pınar Karşıyaka

Finals

Fenerbahçe Ülker vs. Galatasaray Liv Hospital

References
TBL.org.tr
TBF.org.tr

Playoff
Turkish Basketball Super League Playoffs